The Young Trophy is the annual inter-institution sporting competition for young engineers. The event was first held in 1933 when a joint team from the Institution of Mechanical Engineers and the Institution of Civil Engineers challenged the Institute of Electrical and Electronics Engineers (now part of the Institution of Engineering and Technology) to a cricket and tennis match. Subsequent tournaments have been contested over a range of sports such as football, badminton, volleyball, basketball and dodgeball. The participants have also expanded beyond the original three institutions with teams from Royal Institute of British Architects and Chartered Institution of Building Services Engineers competing in 2013.

References

Engineering competitions